The 1988 Michigan State Spartans football team represented Michigan State University in the 1988 NCAA Division I-A football season. The Spartans played their home games at Spartan Stadium in East Lansing, Michigan and were coached by George Perles. The team finished second in the Big Ten Conference with a 6–1–1 conference record, and a 6–5–1 overall record. Michigan State was invited to the 1989 Gator Bowl, losing to Georgia 27–34.

Schedule

Roster

1989 NFL Draft
The following players were selected in the 1989 NFL Draft.

References

Michigan State
Michigan State Spartans football seasons
Michigan State Spartans football